Max Hazelton AM OBE (born May 1927) is an Australian aviator and founder of Hazelton Airlines, alongside his brother Jim, a regional Australian airline which became Regional Express Airlines after a merger in August 2002.

Biography
Born in May 1927, Charles Maxwell Hazelton, from a young age, aimed at becoming a pilot. He joined the Air Training Corps at the age of 16 but, when the Second World War ended in 1945, he saw his pilot career under threat since the Royal Australian Air Force already had too many pilots, seemingly leaving him without a future in the industry.

Working as an apprentice automotive engineer in Sydney, he continued his interest in becoming a pilot, eventually acquiring a private and, later, a commercial pilot's license. With support from his mother he purchased his first aircraft, an Auster Aiglet Trainer for 2,500 pounds. He started his own charter company in 1953 from his brother-in-law’s property at Toogong, New South Wales.

In October 1954 he crashed his plane on a flight from Bankstown Airport in heavy rain near Oberon, but escaped uninjured. While only 16 kilometres from Oberon he got lost in heavy fog, hiking for six days and covering over 100 kilometres before returning to civilisation.

Purchasing a new aircraft, a Cessna 180, he continued flying charters and applying fertiliser and pesticides. He was reported for night flying by the local police, then illegal, but was able to convince the authorities to lift the ban, pointing out that flying conditions were calmer at night and crop spraying was essential to local cotton farmers. In 1959 he moved operations to Cudal, where he operated his own airfield.

Not afraid of controversy, he piloted the South African rugby union team during their tour in Australia and broke a union ban on Merino ram exports to Fiji in 1971 by flying them there.

By 1968 his airline, Hazelton Airlines, operated 22 aircraft. By 1994, when he floated his company on the stock market, Hazelton Airlines carried 330,000 passengers a year. In November 1995 he stepped down as CEO of the airline after a boardroom fight for control of the company. In 2001 the Hazelton family sold their stake in the airline to Ansett Australia, after a take-over battle between the former and Qantas. After Ansett collapsed in September 2001 Hazelton continued operations and, together with Kendell Airlines, became Regional Express Airlines on 1 August 2002.

He continues to be involved in the aviation industry, writing comments in the Central Western Daily on airline industry matters.

References

1927 births
Living people
Australian aviators
Businesspeople in aviation
Officers of the Order of the British Empire